Kees Kwakman (born 10 June 1983) is a Dutch former professional footballer who played as a defensive midfielder. Between 2004 and 2018, he played for FC Volendam, Groningen, RBC Roosendaal, NAC Breda, FC Augsburg and Bidvest Wits. In the summer of 2018, Kwakman retired from football and became a pundit with Fox Sports Eredivisie.

Career
In July 2014 Kwakman signed a one-year deal with South African club Bidvest Wits, with a one-year option to renew.

References

External links
 
 

1983 births
Living people
Dutch footballers
Dutch expatriate footballers
FC Volendam players
RBC Roosendaal players
NAC Breda players
FC Groningen players
Eredivisie players
Eerste Divisie players
FC Augsburg players
Bidvest Wits F.C. players
2. Bundesliga players
Dutch expatriate sportspeople in Germany
Expatriate footballers in Germany
Dutch expatriate sportspeople in South Africa
Expatriate soccer players in South Africa
Association football defenders
People from Purmerend
Footballers from North Holland